Trude Weiss-Rosmarin (June 17, 1908 – June 26, 1989) was a German-American writer, editor, scholar, and feminist activist. With her husband, she co-founded the School of the Jewish Woman in New York City in 1933, and in 1939 founded the Jewish Spectator, a quarterly magazine, which she edited for 50 years.

She was the author of 12 books, including Judaism and Christianity: The differences (1943), Toward Jewish-Muslim Dialogue (1967), and Freedom and Jewish Women (1977).

Early life
Weiss-Rosmarin was born in Frankfurt, Germany, the daughter of Jacob and Celestine (Mullings) Weiss. She attended the University of Berlin from 1927–28, and the University of Leipzig (1929), before obtaining her PhD in Semitics, philosophy, and archeology in 1931 from the University of Würzburg for a thesis on ancient Arab history. While at university, she became active in Jewish and Zionist organizations. She emigrated in 1931 with her husband, Aaron Rosmarin (born 1904), to the United States, where they settled in New York City. The couple divorced in 1951.

Writing and teaching

Weiss-Rosmarin and her husband opened the School of the Jewish Woman in Manhattan in October 1933 under the auspices of Hadassah, the Women's Zionist Organization of America. The school, which closed in 1939, was modeled on the Frankfurt Lehrhaus created by Franz Rosenzweig and Martin Buber, and aimed to combat what Weiss-Rosmarin saw as women's poor access to education. She and her husband offered classes in Torah, Jewish history, Hebrew, and Yiddish.

Out of the school's newsletter grew the Jewish Spectator, which described itself as a "typical family magazine with a special appeal to women." By means of her often controversial editorials, Weiss-Rosmarin sought to influence the American-Jewish community, arguing for changes in Jewish family law, Jewish–Arab co-existence in Israel, access to a Jewish education for women, and equality for women in the synagogue and in public life. An article Weiss-Rosmarin wrote for the Jewish Spectator in 1970, "The Unfreedom of Jewish Women," was considered by historian Paula Hyman as a trailblazer in analyzing the status of Jewish women using feminism.

Weiss-Rosmarin also wrote a regular column, "Letters from New York", in the London Jewish Chronicle and served as national co-chair of education for the Zionist Organization of America. She taught at New York University and the Reconstructionist Rabbinical College, and published books on a variety of subjects. She died of cancer in 1989.

Publications
Religion of Reason (1936)
Hebrew Moses: An Answer to Sigmund Freud (1939)
The Oneg Shabbath Books (1940)
Highlights of Jewish History (1941)
Judaism and Christianity: The Differences (1943)
Jewish Survival (1949)
Jewish Women Through The Ages (1949)
What Every Jewish Woman Should Know (1949)
 Saadia (1959)
Toward Jewish-Muslim Dialogue (1967)
Jewish Expressions on Jesus: An Anthology (1977)
Freedom and Jewish Women (1977)

Articles
She also wrote a number of articles which appeared in Sh'ma: A Journal of Jewish Responsibility, including:
The Duty to Do Justice, Vol.11/no.202 1980.
On Criticizing the Establishment, Vol.1/no.13 1971.
Buber Repressed What Cohen Had Taught, Vol.4/no.682 1974.
An End to Separate and Unequal, Vol.1/no.19 1971.
and more.

See also
Jewish feminism
Role of women in Judaism
Blu Greenberg

References

Sources
Hymen, E. Paula & Dash Moore, Deborah. (eds) (1997) Jewish Women in America: An Historical Encyclopedia. Routledge,  (pp. 1463–1465)
"Inventory to the Trude Weiss-Rosmarin papers, 1931–1984", Jewish American Archives

External links
 Jennifer Breger, Trude Weiss-Rosmarin, Jewish Women Encyclopedia

1908 births
1989 deaths
German feminists
Jewish emigrants from Nazi Germany to the United States
American feminists
Jewish American writers
Jewish feminists
American Zionists
20th-century German women writers
20th-century American Jews
Women founders
American magazine editors
Women magazine editors